The 1883–84 British Home Championship was the inaugural international football tournament, played between the Home Nations of the British Isles which at the time made up the constituent nations of the United Kingdom; England, Scotland, Wales and Ireland. International football matches had begun with annual games played between England and Scotland in 1872 and they had been joined by Wales in 1876 and Ireland in 1882. 

The tournament was played in an unusual layout, with Ireland playing all three of their games first, and losing heavily in each one. Then England and Scotland played what would eventually be the deciding match of the tournament, which Scotland won in a close fought contest. Finally, Wales played both England and Scotland, losing heavily to each in turn and thus granting Scotland victory in the first British Home Championship.  Scotland won the final match, even though many of the best Scottish players were absent playing for Queen's Park FC in the 1884 FA Cup Final, which took place on the same day.

Table

Results

Winning squad

References

Brit
Brit
Brit
Brit
British Home Championship
British Home Championships